Heta-uma ( or ) is a Japanese underground manga movement started in the 1970s with the magazine Garo. Heta-uma can be translated as "bad but good", designating a work which looks poorly drawn, but with an aesthetically conscious quality, opposed to the polished look of mainstream manga.

Some of heta-uma's main artists are Teruhiko Yumura (pen name "King Terry"), Yoshikazu Ebisu and Takashi Nemoto.

References

Further reading 
 
 

Arts in Japan
Manga